Gilbert V. Indeglia (born August 31, 1941) is a former justice of the Rhode Island Supreme Court.

Gilbert Indeglia was born into a family of attorneys and is a grandson of Rhode Island's first official public defender. Indeglia is a 1959 graduate of Providence's Classical High School, a 1963 graduate of Boston College, and a 1966 graduate of the University of Michigan Law School.  After graduation Indeglia worked in private practice for 20 years and served in the RI Air National Guard from 1967–72. He also served as a South Kingstown probate judge and town solicitor and in the Rhode Island House of Representatives in the 48th District from 1985–1989 as a Republican. Indeglia was a member of the House Judiciary Committee that presided over impeachment proceedings for the late Supreme Court Chief Justice Joseph A. Bevilacqua. Indeglia also served as a member of the South Kingstown Town Council from 1977–1984. Indeglia was appointed to the Rhode Island District Court in 1989 and the Rhode Island Superior Court in 2000.  In 2010 Governor Donald Carcieri appointed him to the Rhode Island Supreme Court.

On January 10, 2020, Indeglia announced his intent to retire at the end of June 2020.

Family life
Indeglia is married to the former Elizabeth L. Westcott and as of 2010 has two children and three grandchildren.

References and external links

1941 births
Living people
21st-century American judges
Boston College alumni
Republican Party members of the Rhode Island House of Representatives
People from South Kingstown, Rhode Island
Justices of the Rhode Island Supreme Court
University of Michigan Law School alumni
University of Rhode Island faculty
Classical High School alumni
American people of Italian descent